The 2016 United States Senate election in Hawaii was held November 8, 2016, concurrently with the 2016 U.S. presidential election as well as other elections to the United States Senate and House of Representatives and various state and local elections. The primaries were held August 13. Incumbent Democratic U.S. Senator Brian Schatz won reelection to his first full term in office, defeating Republican former state legislator John Carroll.

Background 
In 2011, Daniel Inouye announced that he planned to run for a record tenth term in 2016, when he would have been 92 years old. He also said, "I have told my staff and I have told my family that when the time comes, when you question my sanity or question my ability to do things physically or mentally, I don't want you to hesitate, do everything to get me out of here, because I want to make certain the people of Hawaii get the best representation possible."

Inouye died on December 17, 2012. Hawaii Governor Neil Abercrombie appointed Lieutenant Governor Brian Schatz, a Democrat, to succeed Inouye. Schatz won a 2014 special election to serve the remainder of Inouye's term.

Democratic primary

Candidates

Declared 
Makani Christensen
 Tutz Honeychurch
 Arturo Reyes, perennial candidate
 Brian Schatz, incumbent Senator
 Miles Shiratori

Declined 
 Colleen Hanabusa, former U.S. Representative and candidate for the U.S. Senate in 2014 (running for HI-01)
 Mark Takai, U.S. Representative (died)
 Tulsi Gabbard, U.S. Representative (running for reelection)

Former
Daniel Inouye, U.S. Senator from Hawaii (1963-2012), U.S. Representative for Hawaii's at-large congressional district (1959-1963). Inouye had declared his intent to run for re-election to a record tenth term, but he died in office on December 17th, 2012.

Results

Republican primary

Candidates

Declared 
 John Carroll, former State Senator, former State Representative, nominee for US Senate in 2000 and perennial candidate
 Karla Gottschalk, attorney
 Eddie Pirkowski, perennial candidate
 John Roco, perennial candidate

Withdrew 
 Charles Collins, candidate for the U.S. Senate in 2012 and for Governor of Hawaii in 2014

Declined 
 Cam Cavasso, former State Representative and Republican nominee for the U.S. Senate in 2004, 2010, and 2014
 Charles Djou, former U.S. Representative (running for Mayor of Honolulu)

Results

Other primaries

Libertarian

Candidates

Declared 
 Michael Kokoski, nominee for the U.S. Senate in 2014

Results

Constitution

Candidates

Declared 
 Joy Allison, independent candidate for the U.S. Senate in 2014

Results

American Shopping

Candidates

Declared 
 John Giuffre

Results

General election 
Schatz defeated Carroll on election day, winning his second election to the U.S. Senate and his first full term after being appointed to the seat in 2012 following the death of Daniel Inouye. This was his largest margin of victory, as he won over 4% more of the electorate in this election.

Fundraising

Predictions

Polling

Results

References

External links 
Official campaign websites
 Brian Schatz (D) for Senate
 John Roco (R) for Senate

2016
Hawaii
United States Senate